Josef K may refer to:
 Josef K., the name of the protagonist of the novel The Trial and the short story A Dream by Franz Kafka
 Josef K (band), Scottish post-punk band